Nicolás Ayr (born October 11, 1982) is an Argentine footballer who played for clubs in Mexico, Paraguay, Colombia and Peru as well as in his native Argentina.

His nicknamed is La Muralla

In 2012, Ayr joined Primera División Peruana side Sporting Cristal from Atlético Huila.

Honours 
Sporting Cristal
 Torneo Descentralizado: 2012

References

External links
 Profile at BDFA 

1982 births
Living people
Argentine footballers
Argentine expatriate footballers
Peruvian Primera División players
Categoría Primera A players
Primera Nacional players
Estudiantes de La Plata footballers
Deportes Tolima footballers
Atlético Huila footballers
2 de Mayo footballers
Aldosivi footballers
Sporting Cristal footballers
Gimnasia y Esgrima de Jujuy footballers
Guillermo Brown footballers
Nueva Chicago footballers
Footballers from La Plata
Expatriate footballers in Peru
Expatriate footballers in Mexico
Expatriate footballers in Paraguay
Expatriate footballers in Colombia
Expatriate footballers in Ecuador
Association football defenders